Nenad Stavrić (27 June 1963 – 18 November 2007) was a Serbian football player and manager.

Playing career
Stavrić played for several clubs in Serbia, including FK Radnički Niš, FK Rad and FK Partizan, before moving abroad and finishing his career with Olympiakos Nicosia.

Managerial career
He managed several clubs in former Yugoslavia, including FK Zvezdara and FK Sileks, as well as clubs throughout the Middle East. While managing Al-Nejmeh SC, he died as a result of a road accident in Damascus on 18 November 2007.

References

External links
 Goalzz
 Stats for Partizan at Partizan official website.
 Stats from Yugoslav Leagues at Zerodic

1963 births
2007 deaths
Association footballers not categorized by position
Serbian footballers
Yugoslav footballers
FK Partizan players
FK Radnički Niš players
FK Rad players
FK Radnički Beograd players
Olympiakos Nicosia players
Expatriate footballers in Cyprus
Serbian expatriate sportspeople in Cyprus
Serbian football managers
FK Sileks managers
Al-Wahda SC (Syria) managers
Al-Arabi SC (Kuwait) managers
Nejmeh SC managers
Kuwait Premier League managers
Lebanese Premier League managers
Serbian expatriate football managers
Expatriate football managers in North Macedonia
Serbian expatriate sportspeople in North Macedonia
Expatriate football managers in Kuwait
Serbian expatriate sportspeople in Kuwait
Expatriate football managers in Lebanon
Serbian expatriate sportspeople in Lebanon
Road incident deaths in Syria
A.C. Marinhense players
F.C. Marco players
FK Pelister players